This is a list of islands of Turkey. There are around 500 islands and islets in the Turkey. These islands are located in the Aegean Sea, Black Sea, Mediterranean Sea, Sea of Marmara, and Turkish lakes. The Turkish words for island/islands/rocks are Adasi/Adalar/Kayaları. The lists in the following sections include name, formal name when different, Turkish Province, sea where the island is located and coordinates.

Islands by body of water

Aegean Sea islands

The following Turkish islands are in the Aegean Sea:

Aydın Province

The Turkish Aegean Sea islands in Aydin Province include the following:

Balıkesir Province

There are at least 54 islands in Balıkesir Province, including islands in the Aegean Sea and the Sea of Marmara.  Many of the islands in the Aegean Sea are part of the Ayvalık Islands Nature Park which contains 22 islands and numerous rocks.  The only two populated Aegean islands are Cunda and Lale Islands.  Cunda Island, which is now a peninsula, is the largest.  The following islands of Balıkesir Province are in the Aegean Sea:

Çanakkale Province

İzmir Province

Muğla Province

Black Sea islands

Mediterranean Sea islands

Turkish islands, islets, and rocks in the Mediterranean Sea  include the following:

Sea of Marmara islands

The following Turkish islands are in the Sea of Marmara:

Lake islands

One Turkish lake, Lake Van, has islands, including the following islands:

See also
Geography of Turkey
Gulfs of Turkey
List of Aegean Islands
List of islands of Greece

Notes or disputes 

 See Imia (Greek) or Kardak (Turkish) and Aegean dispute for a discussion of disputed islands between Greece and Turkey.

References

 
Turkey
Islands